The Caucasian Imamate, also known as the Caucasus Imamate, was a state established by the imams in Dagestan and Chechnya during the early-to-mid 19th century in the North Caucasus, to fight against the Russian Empire during the Caucasian War, where Russia sought to conquer the Caucasus in order to secure communications with its new territories south of the mountains.

Background

Previously in the Northeast Caucasus, there had, since recordable history, been a large array of states.

Caucasian Albania had existed in Southern Dagestan, for most of its history being a vassal under the direct rule of the Parthians and later the Sasanid Persians, but eventually, the majority converted to Islam following the Muslim conquest of Persia, as their overlords did. Traveling Arabs proved to be instrumental in this, and after they left, they relinquished the new Muslim states of Lezghia (centered in the Islamic learning center of Derbent), Lakia (centered in another, rival city of Islamic learning, Kumukh) and their less important neighbors. In these areas (Southern and Southeast Dagestan), where interethnic conflict was often present, Islam served a unifying role, and it was often the clerical establishment which mediated disputes.

In Chechnya, Islam was considerably less ingrained than in the Imamate's other claims. Islam only began to make inroads in Chechnya during the 16th century, and even then was not highly important, with the indigenous Vainakh religion still holding strong. It was only at the point of the threat of Russian conquest that people began to turn en masse, to Islam as a way to mobilize a coordinated resistance to Russian encroachment. Islam was spread to the Chechens this way mainly through the work of Sheikh Mansur. Nonetheless, as Shamil and his predecessors discovered, the actual commitment of the Chechens to Islam was disappointingly small. Paganism remained in practice until the early 19th century.

However, although Islam was indeed extremely important in parts of the Caucasus, and was also a unifying force for resistance to Russia, political Islam was challenged by many different groups. Islam in Central and Northern Dagestan and Chechnya was overwhelmingly Naqshbandi at this time. However, Naqshbandiism, which was highly mystical in nature, had internal divisions over whether it should be political or whether, indeed, political Sufism tainted the religion's purity. The drive to establish sharia law, in particular, was opposed on many fronts. First of all, the indigenous Caucasian states run by Avars, Kumyks, Lezgins, Laks and others (particularly the widow ruler Pakhu Bike, Queen of the Khanate of Avaria) opposed it as it seemed to take legitimacy away from their own positions. Sharia also clashed with adat, the indigenous law system that many, especially peoples such as the Chechens, viewed as superior to sharia. For these reasons, and other more subtle ones, in most areas the Imamate claimed as its domain, it was, in fact, simply viewed as the lesser evil to Russia.

Establishment

Parts of the Muslim population started to radicalize due to rapacious Russian activity and taxation and were calling for a Gazawat (Holy War) and the enforcement of Sharia. Two imams, Imam Ghazi Muhammad and Imam Shamil, attempted to initiate the Gazawat they called for by trying to seize the capital of Khunzakh from the khan of Pakkou-Bekkhe in 1827. The attack failed and so, disheartened, the imams bided their time, waiting for the various Muslim tribes to agree with one another. In 1828, the two attacked again, this time in Northern Dagestan, and with success.

The Russians, who at the time ruled over Northern Dagestan, were used to fighting on the open battlefields of Europe in lined formation instead of the thick woods of the Caucasus and so were very unprepared for the guerrilla tactics of the two imams, resulting in a victory for Ghazi and Shamil. However, this action would start the Caucasian War , a war between the Imamate and Russia that would eventually lead to the capture of all the Caucasus by the Russian Empire.

Here the Imamate was formed, with Ghazi self-appointed as its first leader. The supreme government body of the Imamate, the State Council (Dīvān) was formed which consisted of Sufi Muslim scholars and students as well as Shamil's military lieutenants, his Naibs.

For military details see Murid War.

Expansion

During the war, the Imamate would see support from other Muslim tribes, eventually amalgamating with Chechnya, parts of Ingushetia and the rest of Dagestan during the Imamship of Imam Shamil. The
western tribes, the Adyghes, would fall under the control of the Imamate during Shamil's rule as well, but a problem arose in the form of the Kabardins and Ossetians that sat in between Shamil's east and west tribes, so these tribes were run mainly by Shamil's naibs who had traveled to the west instead of the Dīvān itself.

Politics
The Imamate's first leader was Imam Ghazi Muhammad, who ruled from 1828 until 1832 when he was succeeded by Gamzat-bek four years later. When he was murdered in 1834, by a band which included Hadji Murad, Shamil became the third imam. The Imamate reached its peak under Shamil's rule, spanning all of the Muslim Northern Caucasus.

The Imamate was a highly militaristic country, having been at war since its establishment. Its politics were always concerned with the furthering of Islam or the Caucasian War. As such, the only people that ever sat on its council were Muslim scholars or military naibs.

The war and the surrender of the Imamate

The Caucasians gained several great victories early in their war with Russia, but at the time Russia hadn't really committed to the war seriously. With their great victory over Napoleon's Grand Army in 1812, the Russian people saw little concern in the petty "Asiatic" resistance occurring on their southern borders. However, the Caucasians did reach a point where they pushed the Russians back hard enough to warrant a full-scale Russian counter-attack. In 1832 Shamil and Ghazi launched a failed attack on Vladikavkaz, which was at the time a Russian military fort mockingly named "Ruler of The Caucasus" - from  + . The Russians countered: General  launched an assault on the de facto capital of the Imamate, the small settlement of Gimry. This resulted in the seizure of the town by the Russians (October 1832) and the death of Ghazi Muhammad. Shamil himself, the only man to escape the battle, went into hiding to evade the Russians. Everyone assumed that he had died.

In the absence of Shamil, an imam by the name of Gamzat-bek ruled (1832-1834). Gamzat-bek, an imam who had played a vital role in securing the Avar Khans for the Imamate, had since been a naib to Shamil and Ghazi. Shamil returned a year later, but Gamzat-bek was assassinated by the same Avar Khanates he had defeated. With no one else to take the position, Shamil became the third leader of the Imamate. Shamil would turn out to be the greatest of the Imams by far and would rule for 25 years (1834-1859).

Shamil sought to build on British popular support for his anti-Russian struggle in "the Great Game" context, but no official British assistance arrived.
Shamil conquered the Western Muslim tribes, and transformed a group of small bickering villages into a united country. However, he also saw great casualties to his people, particularly in the Siege of Akhoulgo in Dagestan in 1839, where he lost around 4500 of his own people. But he continued to rule until 1859, when Emperor Alexander II of Russia offered Shamil a peaceful surrender - he would even be a guest of the imperial palace. Shamil agreed, and the Caucasian Imamate was no more. However, fighting did not immediately cease.

The fate of Imam Shamil

As Charles King notes,
Whereas previous enemies of the empire had been imprisoned, killed or exiled, Shamil became a national celebrity [in Russia]. After his surrender, he settled into a comfortable retirement in Kaluga, southeast of Moscow.

In 1859, Shamil wrote to one of his sons: "By the will of the Almighty, the Absolute Governor, I have fallen into the hands of unbelievers... the Great Emperor... has settled me here... in a tall, spacious house with carpets and all the necessities."

Fourth Imamate
After the Russian Revolution of 1917, an attempt to reestablish the Imamate with the help of Turkey, during March–April 1918, was made by the son of one of Shamil's naibs, Najmuddin Hotso. This name stems from the Dagestani settlement of Gotso (when he was awarded nobility by Tsar). He was pronounced the fourth Imam of the North Caucasus and deposed the Soviet power, but was soon defeated by the Soviets. Hotso only had support in Dagestan, and there he carried on his fight (in Chechnya, meanwhile, North Caucasian nationalists of various creeds similarly went into guerrilla war against the Russians). Both rebellions were finally quelled in 1925.

See also 
Caucasian War
Russian conquest of Chechnya and Dagestan
Galashkinskoe Naibstvo
Mountainous Republic of the Northern Caucasus (1917–1922)
North Caucasian Soviet Republic (1918)
North Caucasian Emirate (1919–1920)
Mountain Autonomous Soviet Socialist Republic (1921–1924)
Confederation of Mountain Peoples of the Caucasus (1989–2000)
Caucasus Emirate (2007–2016)

References

Further reading
 Pokrovsky N. I. Caucasian Wars and the Imamate of Shamil / Foreword. N. N. Pokrovsky, introduction. and approx. V. G. Gadzhiev. — M.: ROSSPEN, 2000. — 511 p. — ISBN 5-8243-0078-X.

 Kaziev, Shapi. Imam Shamil. "Molodaya Gvardiya" publishers. Moscow, 2001, 2003, 2006, 2010
 Kaziev, Shapi. Akhoulgo. Caucasian War of 19th century. The historical novel. "Epoch", Publishing house. Makhachkala, 2008. 
 Derluguian, G (2005). "Chapter Three: Historical Formation" A World History of The Noxchi (https://web.archive.org/web/20091229135530/http://www.yale.edu/agrarianstudies/papers/11noxchi.pdf)
 Cahoon, B (2002) "South and the Caucasus: Daghestan" Russian Civil War Polities (http://www.worldstatesmen.org/Russia_war.html)

History of Dagestan
History of Chechnya
History of Ingushetia
Former Muslim countries in Europe
History of the North Caucasus
States and territories established in 1828
States and territories disestablished in 1859
Islam in the Caucasus